Sildalcea campestris is a species of flowering plant in the mallow family known by the common name meadow checker-mallow. It is native only to portions of western Oregon, in the Pacific Northwest region of North America.

Distribution 
Meadow checker-mallow occurs in grassy meadows, unplowed fields, and along roadsides in the Willamette Valley. Historically native to the following Oregon Counties: Benton, Clackamas, Douglas, Lane, Linn, Marion, Multnomah, Polk, Washington, Yamhill. Currently it is found only in the central portion of its range and is locally common in the Salem area. It is not known to occur at elevations above 250 meters.

Description 
Sidalcea campestris is a taprooted perennial herb that grows from thick, stubby rhizomes. It has a basal rosette of toothed leaves. Its stems are erect and hollow. The flowers are five-petaled and numerous, with typically fifty or more per plant, forming in branched racemes atop stems. The flowers range in color from white to pink. Sidalcea campestris prefers moist, but well drained to dry soil and full sun to part shade.

Ecology 
It is vulnerable to herbicide spraying due to population occurrences along fences and roadsides. Its small historic range is another concern.

References 

campestris
Flora of Oregon
Endemic flora of Oregon
Endemic flora of the United States